Shegavicha Rana Gajanan is a Marathi released on 11 December 2004. Produced and directed by Babanrao Gholap.

Cast 
 Sayaji Shinde as Gajanan Maharaj
 Babanrao Gholap
 Ravindra Berde
 Deepak Shirke

Soundtrack
The music is provided by Sanjay Geete.

References

External links 
  Music - music.ovi.com
  Movie Details/VCD - ezmaal.com
 Movie Album - dhingana.com

2004 films
2000s Marathi-language films
Biographical films about religious leaders